Kouign patatez (Breton for potato cake) is a Breton dish made with crushed baked potatoes mixed with flour, traditionally buckwheat flour (blé noir, or sarrasin). The resulting dough is shaped into a galette, then baked in the oven.

References

Breton cuisine
Potato dishes